The leaders of the Palestinian institutions are the leaders of the organs of the various Palestinian political entities - the Palestine Liberation Organization, the Palestinian National Authority and the State of Palestine.

Legislative 
 Chairman of the Palestinian National Council for the Palestinian National Council and the Palestinian Central Council of the PLO and the State of Palestine - Salim Zanoun
 Speaker of the Palestinian Legislative Council for the Palestinian Legislative Council of the PNA - Aziz Dweik

Executive 
 Chairman of the Executive Committee of the Palestine Liberation Organization for the Executive Committee of the Palestine Liberation Organization and performing governmental functions for the State of Palestine - Mahmoud Abbas
 Prime Minister of the Palestinian National Authority - disputed: Salam Fayyad (in the West Bank) and Ismail Haniyeh (in the Gaza Strip)

Presidents 
 President of the State of Palestine - Mahmoud Abbas
 President of the Palestinian National Authority - disputed: Mahmoud Abbas or Aziz Dweik
Sometimes both offices are held by the same person, or one or both of these is held by the same person who is also the Chairman of the Executive Committee of the Palestine Liberation Organization. The reference "President of Palestine" is utilized as short form for these positions.

   [acting] — [not applicable]

References 

Palestinian politics
State of Palestine
Palestine Liberation Organization
Politics of the Palestinian National Authority